Moses the Black  (330 – 405), also known as Moses the Strong, Moses the Abyssinian, Moses the Robber, and Moses the Ethiopian, was an ascetic monk and priest in Egypt in the fourth century AD, and a notable Desert Father. He is highly venerated in both the Eastern Orthodox Church and the Oriental Orthodox Church, making him amongst the most notable Desert Fathers. According to stories about him, he converted from a life of crime to one of asceticism. He is mentioned in Sozomen's Ecclesiastical History, written about 70 years after Moses's death.

Biography

Early life
Moses was a slave of a government official in Egypt until he was dismissed for theft and suspected murder. He then roamed the Nile Valley with an infamous and violent gang of 75 robbers.
Moses was a man of huge physical stature, strength and courage, and became leader of this gang of robbers who became a social menace and a living terror to the communities where they roamed.

Conversion to Christianity
On one occasion, a barking dog prevented Moses from carrying out a robbery, so he swore vengeance on the owner. In a second attempt, with weapons in his mouth, Moses swam the river toward the owner's hut. The owner, again alerted, was able to hide, and the frustrated Moses stole some of his sheep and took them to slaughter. Attempting to hide from local authorities, he took shelter with some monks in a colony in the desert of Wadi El Natrun, then called Scetes, near Alexandria. The dedication of their lives, as well as their peace and contentment, influenced Moses deeply. He soon gave up his old way of life, became a Christian, was baptized and joined the monastic community at Scetes.

Monastic life
Moses had a rather difficult time adjusting to regular monastic discipline. His flair for adventure remained with him. Attacked by a group of robbers in his desert cell, Moses fought back, overpowered the intruders, and dragged them to the chapel where the other monks were at prayer. He told the brothers that he did not think it was Christian to hurt the robbers and asked what he should do with them. The robbers themselves repented and joined the community as brothers afterwards. Moses was zealous in all he did, but became discouraged when he concluded he was not perfect enough. Early one morning, Isidore, abbot of the monastery, took Moses to the roof and together they watched the first rays of dawn come over the horizon. Isidore said to Moses, "Only slowly do the rays of the sun drive away the night and usher in a new day, and thus, only slowly does one become a perfect contemplative."

Moses proved to be effective as a prophetic spiritual leader. The abbot ordered the brothers to fast during a particular week. Some brothers came to Moses, and he prepared a meal for them. Neighboring monks reported to the abbot that Moses was breaking the fast. When they came to confront Moses, they changed their minds, saying, "You did not keep a human commandment, but it was so that you might keep the divine commandment of hospitality." Some see in this account one of the earliest allusions to the Paschal fast, which developed at this time.

When a brother committed a fault and Moses was invited to a meeting to discuss an appropriate penance, Moses refused to attend. When he was again called to the meeting, Moses took a leaking jug filled with water and carried it on his shoulder. Another version of the story has him carrying a basket filled with sand. When he arrived at the meeting place, the others asked why he was carrying the jug. He replied, "My sins run out behind me and I do not see them, but today I am coming to judge the errors of another." On hearing this, the assembled brothers forgave the erring monk.

Moses became the spiritual leader of a colony of hermits in the Western Desert. Later, he was ordained a priest.

Death
At about age 75, about the year 405 AD, word came that the Mazices, a group of Berbers, planned to attack the monastery. The brothers wanted to defend themselves, but Moses forbade it. He told them to retreat, rather than take up weapons. Citing that a violent death was the appropriate death for a former robber—"All who take the sword will perish by the sword"—he opted to remain behind. He was joined by seven others, and they were together martyred by the bandits on 24 Paoni (July 1).

A different story of Abba Moses' death is related in The Paradise of the Holy Fathers:31. Abba Poemen said: Abba Moses asked Abba Zechariah a question when he was about to die, and said unto him, "Father, is it good that we should hold our peace?" And Zechariah said unto him, "Yea, my son, hold thy peace." And at the time of his death, whilst Abba Isidore was sitting with him, Abba Moses looked up to heaven, and said, "Rejoice and be glad, O my son Zechariah, for the gates of heaven have been opened."

Legacy
Moses was highly praised by his contemporaries. In his 5th century AD Ecclesiastical History, written about 70 years after Moses's death, Hermias Sozomen sums up Moses's legacy as follows:

A modern interpretation honors Moses the Ethiopian as an apostle of non-violence. His relics and major shrine are found today at the Church of the Virgin Mary in the Paromeos Monastery, a Coptic Orthodox monastery located in Wadi El Natrun in Egypt.

See also
Paromeos Monastery
Or of Nitria
Scetes
Coptic Orthodox Church of Alexandria
Coptic Catholic Church
Monastery of Saint Moses the Abyssinian
Black people in ancient Roman history

Citations

Primary sources

External links

St Mary of Egypt Orthodox Church - About
Brotherhood of St Moses the Black
St. Moses the Black Priory
St. Moses the Black, robber turned monk
Santiebeati: Moses the Black

330 births
405 deaths
Saints from Roman Egypt
Ethiopian saints
Eastern Catholic saints
Egyptian Christian monks
4th-century Byzantine monks
5th-century Byzantine monks
5th-century Christian saints
Desert Fathers